Deprez or Déprez is a French/Belgian surname that may refer to
Étienne Deprez-Crassier (1733–1803), French politician and army commander 
Gérard Deprez (born 1943), Belgian politician
Hilaire Deprez (1922–1957), Belgian sprint canoer
Kristoff Deprez (born 1981), Belgian association football player
Louis Déprez (1921–1999), French cyclist
Marcel Deprez (1843–1918), French electrical engineer
Maurice Deprez (1886–?), Belgian ice hockey player
Wouter Deprez (born 1975), Belgian comedian and cabaretier

See also
Desprez